Baltaysky District is an administrative and municipal district (raion), one of the thirty-eight in Saratov Oblast, Russia. It is located in the north of the oblast. Its administrative center is the rural locality (a selo) of Baltay. Population: 12,282 (2010 Census);  The population of Baltay accounts for 31.5% of the district's total population.

References

Notes

Sources

Districts of Saratov Oblast